Storm Bull (October 13, 1913 – July 22, 2007)  was an American musician, composer and educator. He was Professor Emeritus at the College of Music, University of Colorado at Boulder and Head of the Division of Piano.

Background

Johan Storm Bull, the only child of Eyvind Hagerup Bull (1882–1949) and Agnes Hagerup Bull (1885–1950), was born in Chicago, Illinois . His family heritage included the musical traditions of Norway. Both of Storm's grandfathers were nephews of the Norwegian violinist Ole Bull and were also first cousins of the Norwegian composer Edvard Grieg.
In 1919, Storm Bull began his formal musical training at the Laboratory Schools of the University of Chicago, the American Conservatory of Music, and the Chicago Musical College. His teachers during this time included Percy Grainger.

Career
In 1929, his debut as a soloist took place at age 16 in Oslo, Norway.  He performed Edvard Grieg's Piano Concerto in A minor with the Orchestra of the Oslo Philharmonic conducted by Issay Dobrowen before an audience which included Nina Hagerup Grieg, the composer's widow.

In 1931, he studied in Paris with Lazare Lévy at the Ecole Normale de Musique and at the Sorbonne. Bull continued his musical training at the Liszt Academy and the University of Budapest. He was the private pupil of the Hungarian composer Béla Bartók.

On March 2, 1939, he gave the first North American performance of Bartók's Second Piano Concerto with the Chicago Symphony Orchestra conducted by Frederick Stock. He performed with the Montreal Symphony Orchestra conducted by Douglas Clarke and made his concert debut in New York City with a solo recital at Town Hall.

Bull served three years in the U.S. Navy during World War II in a precursor to the Navy SEALS. Bull was a Chief Specialist in Athletics, Underwater Demolition Team. Starting in 1945, he spent two years teaching at Baylor University before accepting a professorship at the University of Colorado, Boulder in 1947. During his time at CU-Boulder, his students would include classical musician David Schrader and composer/pianist Dave Grusin.

In 1954, Bull was honored as a Fulbright Grant Professor of Musicology at the University of Oslo, Norway. In 1969, Storm Bull was honored with the Distinguished Achievement Award for extraordinary contributions to the cultural life of the United States and Norway by the Scandinavian Foundation at the University of Denver. After thirty years with the University of Colorado College of Music, Bull retired in 1977 as Professor Emeritus and Head of the Piano Division.

Personal life

In 1939 he married Ellen Elizabeth Cross (1915–2003), the daughter of Celtic studies scholar Tom Peete Cross.
Storm Bull retired to Arizona during 1996 and died at age 93 in Mesa, Arizona.

Bibliography
 Index to Biographies of Contemporary Composers. Volume 3 (The Scarecrow Press, Inc. 1987)

Selected compositions

 Prelude for Piano	 –				April 1928
Caprice for Piano	 –				December  1928
Improvisations and Fugue on an Original Theme  –	May 1930
Nocturne for Symphonic Band  –			June 1937
Norwegian Folk Melodies	–			July 1937
Green Bushes	  –				June 1946

References

External links
 Storm Bull Collection (University of Colorado Boulder, American Music Research Center) 

1913 births
2007 deaths
Baylor University faculty
University of Colorado faculty
American male classical composers
American classical composers
American people of Norwegian descent
Musicians from Chicago
20th-century classical composers
American Conservatory of Music alumni
20th-century American composers
Classical musicians from Illinois
20th-century American male musicians
Fulbright alumni